Thiendorf is a municipality in the district of Meißen, in Saxony, Germany. It is located near Dresden.

Municipality subdivisions
On 1 January 2016, the former municipality Tauscha became part of Thiendorf. Thiendorf includes the following subdivisions (the former subdivisions of Tauscha are marked with a star):

Dobra *
Kleinnaundorf *
Lötzschen
Lüttichau
Lüttichau/Anbau
Naundorf bei Ortrand
Ponickau
Sacka
Stölpchen
Tauscha *
Thiendorf
Welxande
Würschnitz *
Zschorna *

References 

Meissen (district)